The 2014 Campeonato Baiano de Futebol was the 110th season of Bahia's top professional football league. The competition began on January 8 and ended on April 13. Bahia won the championship by the 45th time, while Juazeiro and Botafogo de Salvador were relegated.

Format

In the first stage, all teams except those who are playing in the Copa do Nordeste, play against each other in a single round-robin. The worst 2 teams are relegated, and the best five advance to the second stage. The five teams are joined by the three from the Copa Nordeste. 

The eight teams are split in two groups, and play against the teams in the other group twice (home and away). The two best from each team advance to the final stage, where they face in the semifinals and then the finals.

Participating teams

First stage

Results

Second stage

Group 2

Group 3

Results

Semifinals

|}

Finals

Bahia won 4–2 on aggregate.

References

Baiano
Campeonato Baiano